Son Chol-u (born 3 March 1973,) is a North Korean cross-country skier. He competed in the men's 10 kilometre classical event at the 1992 Winter Olympics.

References

External links
 

1973 births
Living people
North Korean male cross-country skiers
Olympic cross-country skiers of North Korea
Cross-country skiers at the 1992 Winter Olympics
Place of birth missing (living people)